Doris Kirkman (July 15, 1930 – June 16, 2010) was an American gymnast. She competed in seven events at the 1952 Summer Olympics.

References

External links
 

1930 births
2010 deaths
American female artistic gymnasts
Olympic gymnasts of the United States
Gymnasts at the 1952 Summer Olympics
Sportspeople from Elizabeth, New Jersey
21st-century American women